Kokel may refer to:

Aleksey Kokel, a Chuvash painter
German name of Târnava River
Kokel, a settlement in the administrative unit Kodovjat, Albania